This article is about the particular significance of the year 1984 to Wales and its people.

Incumbents

Secretary of State for Wales – Nicholas Edwards
Archbishop of Wales – Derrick Childs, Bishop of Monmouth
Archdruid of the National Eisteddfod of Wales
Jâms Nicholas (outgoing)
Elerydd (incoming)

Events
2 March – Carmarthen MP Dr Roger Thomas announces his resignation, having been prosecuted for importuning.
12 March – The miners' strike begins, with a solid turn out from all NUM mines in Wales.
31 March - The Guildford Crescent Baths close in Cardiff after 122 years, despite a campaign to keep them open.
3 May – At the Cynon Valley by-election brought about by the death of MP Ioan Lyonel Evans, Ann Clwyd retains the seat for Labour with an increased majority.
19 July – The Lleyn Peninsula earthquake, which strikes the Llŷn Peninsula at 06:56 UTC (07:56 BST), measuring 5.4 on the Richter scale, is the largest known onshore earthquake to occur in the UK since instrumental measurements began.
4 October – Dafydd Wigley resigns as leader of Plaid Cymru for domestic reasons.
30 November – Taxi driver David Wilkie is killed when a concrete block is dropped onto his car as he drives a strikebreaker to work on the M4 motorway. Dean Hancock and Russell Shankland of Rhymney are later convicted of murder.
3 December – First McDonald's hamburger fast food restaurant in Wales opens in Cardiff.
date unknown
Sam Edwards becomes Cavendish Professor of Physics at Cambridge.
Clive Sinclair's C5 electric vehicle is manufactured at the Hoover works in Merthyr Tydfil.
Border Breweries (Wrexham) ceases to brew in Wales.
Creation of Cadw: Welsh Historic Monuments Executive Agency.

Arts and literature

Awards
Griff Rhys Jones wins the Laurence Olivier Theatre Award for Best Comedy Performance for his role in Charley's Aunt.
National Eisteddfod of Wales (held in Lampeter)
National Eisteddfod of Wales: Chair – Aled Rhys Wiliam
National Eisteddfod of Wales: Crown – John Roderick Rees
National Eisteddfod of Wales: Prose Medal – John Idris Owen
Gwobr Goffa Daniel Owen – Richard Cyril Hughes, Castell Cyfaddawd

New books

English language
Duncan Bush – Aquarium
Hywel Francis – Miners Against Fascism: Wales and the Spanish Civil War
Sian James – Dragons and Roses
Mike Jenkins – Empire of Smoke
Robert Minhinnick – Life Sentences
Leslie Thomas – In My Wildest Dreams

Welsh language
Gwynn ap Gwilym – Gwales
Geraint H. Jenkins – Hanes Cymru yn y Cyfnod Modern Cynnar: 1530–1760
Alun Jones – Oed Rhyw Addewid
Gerwyn Williams – Colli cyswllt

Music
Ar Log IV
The Alarm – Declaration (debut studio album)
Icons of Filth – Onward Christian Soldiers
Shakin' Stevens records "Teardrops" with Hank Marvin on guitar.
Phil Campbell joins Motörhead.
First Brecon Jazz Festival staged.

Film
Ray Milland makes his last film appearance in The Sea Serpent.
Sian Phillips stars in Dune.
Kevin Allen makes his big screen debut in The Man Who Shot Christmas.

Welsh-language films
None

Broadcasting
Gareth Gwenlan becomes Head of Comedy at the BBC.

Welsh-language television

English-language television
The District Nurse starring Nerys Hughes

Sport
Football – Ian Rush becomes the first Welshman to win the European Golden Boot award.
BBC Wales Sports Personality of the Year – Ian Rush
Horse racing – Neil Doughty wins the Grand National on Hallo Dandy.

Births
27 February – Rhys Williams, athlete
9 March – Owain Wyn Evans, broadcast presenter
11 March – Tom James, Olympic gold medal-winning rower
22 June – Arron Davies, footballer
23 June – Duffy, singer
31 July – Craig Stiens, footballer
14 August – Rob Davies, table tennis player
15 September – Prince Harry of Wales, son of the Prince and Princess of Wales (Charles and Diana)
20 September – Byron Anthony, footballer
15 October – Owain Tudur Jones, footballer
24 November – Matthew Mason, cricketer
date unknown – Gwawr Edwards, soprano

Deaths
4 January – Enoch Jenkins, sports shooter, 91
11 January – Gwyn Thomas, rugby player, 91
14 January – Ivan Lloyd-Phillips, colonial administrator, 73
26 January – Nathan Rocyn-Jones, doctor, international rugby player and President of the WRU, 81
10 February – Ioan Evans, politician, 56
11 April – John Lloyd Thomas, clergyman and teacher, 76
15 April – Tommy Cooper, comedian, 63 (heart attack on stage)
21 April – Wilf Hughes, cricketer, 73
8 May – David Williams, geologist, 85
20 May – Meredith Thomas, flying ace, 91
13 June – David Evans, microbiologist, 74 
18 June – Idris Foster, academic, 72
22 June – Dill Jones, jazz pianist, 60
29 June – Seiriol Evans, clergyman and writer, 89
6 July – Denys Val Baker, British writer and promoter of Celtic culture, 66
30 July – Peter Jones, surgeon, 67
5 August – Richard Burton, actor, 58 (brain haemorrhage)
17 August – Mostyn Thomas, operatic baritone, 88
27 August – Amabel Williams-Ellis, writer, 90
9 September – Margaret Phillips, actress, 61
23 September – Daniel Granville West, politician, 80
12 October – Sir Anthony Berry, politician and son of Gomer Berry, 1st Viscount Kemsley, 59 (killed in Brighton hotel bombing)
26 October – Seaborne Davies, lawyer and politician, 80
18 November – Thomas Jones, Baron Maelor, politician, 86
11 December (in Hendon) – Will Paynter, miners' leader, 81
date unknown – Arthur Fear, operatic bass-baritone

See also
1984 in Northern Ireland

References

 
 Wales
Wales